The ZAZ-969 (also called LuAZ-969) was a Soviet four-wheel drive automobile built by the Zaporizhia Automobile Building Plant. The first Soviet vehicle with front wheel drive, it was based on the LuAZ-967.

Development
Developing ideas from the unbuilt Moskvitch 415 prototype, designers used the LuAZ-967 as a basis for a four-wheel drive. vehicle They added a body to the LuAZ's bare form, and fitted a   MeMZ 966 air-cooled four-cylinder engine. No other mechanical changes were made.

Its pioneering (for a Soviet car) front wheel drive was due to a lack of drivable rear axles from the supplier, which was giving priority to the LuAZ-967. Nevertheless, the 969 performed well, with a weight of only  (thanks in part to a soft top) and an  wheelbase. The transmission was a four-speed.

Production
A pre-production batch of fifty was created in 1965, dubbed ZAZ-969, and production was authorized in 1966 as the 969V. It was built by ZAZ until 1971, when LuAZ took over. When LuAZ took over production (making it the LuAZ-969), four-wheel drive became standard. In 1975, the LuAZ-969A replaced the original 969, offering a new   MeMZ 969 four-cylinder engine. It survived until 1979. This was followed by a hard-top panel van version in 1977, known as the 969F, with a  payload, which was only built in small quantities.

LuAZ began developing a replacement for the 969A in 1974, the 969M; it entered production in 1979. It was named Volin, for the region around Lutsk (where the factory was located). It retained the  engine, but changed to disk brakes with servo assist. Door locks were added. Folding windshield was standard.

Exports were limited, though it proved popular in Italy, where Martorelli also offered it with a Ford engine.

References

Sources 

ZAZ vehicles
1970s cars
Soviet automobiles
Cars introduced in 1965